ENEC is the high quality European mark for electrical products that demonstrates compliance with European safety standards.

ENEC Description
ENEC is an abbreviation for "European Norms Electrical Certification". 
These four letters are part of the registered trademark that demonstrate that a product has been certified by one of the national certification institutes in Europe. Today, there are 25 certification institutes (also called certification bodies) who are signatories of the agreement. Apart from the mark itself, there are also two digits numbers that indicate which certification body has issued the ENEC certification.
The ENEC agreement was originally started with a view to providing manufacturing of luminaires with a joint European certification mark to replace all the different national marks. In 1999, the agreement was expanded to include:
 Lighting
 Components for lamp holders
 IT
 Electric office equipment
 Safety isolating transformers
 Isolating transformers and separating transformers
 Power supply units
 Switches

ENEC is a product certification type 5. In particular, this scheme includes factory inspection at the manufacturer's premises.

Established since 2010, ENEC is trying to be the standard for safety reassurance in the European Market.

The application of the ENEC Mark to an electrical product ensures that it complies with the relevant European safety standards and has to be accepted by all member states. Monitoring of product and production provides safety assurance for the lifetime of the ENEC certification.

Household appliances, electronic equipment, lighting
Compliance with the EU low-voltage-directive
Reduced license costs
Evidence in case of product liability claims

Obtaining the ENEC certificate
Testing and certification according to European standards. Product manufacturing monitored by an accredited inspection division like Electrosuisse SEV, Nemko, MIRTEC S.A, TSE or an equivalent partner organization for foreign production facilities to ensure consistent product compliance.

See also
Conformance mark
Certification mark
CENELEC

References 
Website: https://www.enec.com/page.php?p=2
Certification marks
Electrical safety
Electrical standards